The Yampa River Botanic Park (6 acres) is a botanical garden located on Pamela Lane, off U.S. Highway 40, outside Steamboat Springs, Colorado. It is open dawn to dusk from spring until the first heavy snow.

Summers are dry and intensely sunny; winters are cold with heavy snow.

The park includes a number of individual gardens: Annuals Garden, Butterfly Garden, Children's Garden, Corner Gardens, Culinary Herb Garden, Daylily Garden, Dorothy's Garden (native plants), Garden for All Seasons, Grove Garden (with aspens), Hidden Garden (shade), High Country Natives Garden, Hummingbird Garden, Iris Garden, Kerry's Garden (native and ornamental plants), Lynne's Garden (columbines), Medicinal Herb Garden, Members' Rock Garden, Penstemon Garden, Pioneer Garden, Pond Garden (water lilies, etc.), Rainbow Garden, Reflecting Garden (Japanese garden with reflecting pond), Rose Garden, September Charm Garden, Spring Bulb Garden, Summer Bulb Garden, Summer Sunshine Garden, Trail Garden, Tranquility Garden, Vegetable Garden, Water Wise Garden, and Windigo Garden.

See also
 List of botanical gardens in the United States

External links
 Official website

Botanical gardens in Colorado
Protected areas of Routt County, Colorado